Ilya Trofimovich Bogdesko (April 20, 1923 in Botushany near Rîbnița, Ukrainian SSR – March 29, 2010 in Saint Petersburg, Russia) was a Soviet and Moldovan graphic artist, People's Painter of the USSR (1963), member of the Academy of Arts (1988).

Participant of the Great Patriotic War. Drafted into the Red Army was in 1942.

One of the most famous works, illustrations for the Jonathan Swift novel Gulliver's Travels, uses in the technique of engraving on metal cutter, widespread in the days of Swift. For this work at the National competition Book Art in 1980, Bogdesko was awarded the diploma of Ivan Fyodorov.

Over the course of five years, For about five years Bogdesko created a series of 33 illustrations for the Miguel de Cervantes novel Don Quixote. He illustrated the Ion Creangă book Punguța cu doi bani (Wallet with Two Coins).

References

External links 
 Выдающиеся российские шрифтовики и каллиграфы // Adme.ru, 2 апреля 2009

1923 births
2010 deaths
20th-century Russian painters
Communist Party of the Soviet Union members
Members of the Supreme Soviet of the Moldavian Soviet Socialist Republic
Repin Institute of Arts alumni
People's Artists of the USSR (visual arts)
Recipients of the Order of the Red Banner of Labour
Recipients of the Order of the Republic (Moldova)
Moldovan painters
Russian male painters
Soviet painters
Soviet people of World War II
Typographers and type designers
Romanian people of Moldovan descent
Russian people of Romanian descent
20th-century Russian male artists